Värsta plattan is the sixth studio album by Swedish-Finnish singer Markoolio, released on 4 April 2007.

Track listing
Kungen ringer Markoolio - 2:37
Värsta schlagern (duet with Linda Bengtzing) - 3.01
Ingen sommar utan reggae - 3:48
Markoolio söker till Idol - 0.50
Idollåten - 4:15
Emma Emma (duet with Tilde Fröling) - 3.33
Markoolio kommer till kalaset - 1:34
Min lilla mojo-grej - 3.41
Rymden runt på 24 dar - 3:09
Vad gör du - 3.18
Partypest - 4:15
Betalningen - 1.11
Pimpar loss - 3:50
Värsta schlagern videon

Charts

References 

2007 albums
Markoolio albums
Swedish-language albums